El Kebab is a town in Khénifra Province, Béni Mellal-Khénifra, Morocco. According to the 2004 census it has a population of 8,541.

References

Populated places in Khénifra Province